American rock band X Ambassadors has released three studio albums, four extended plays and 31 singles.

Studio albums

Extended plays

Singles

As lead artist

As featured artist

Other charting songs

Guest appearances

Music videos

Notes

References

Discographies of American artists
Rock music group discographies